Luparense Football Club, is a futsal club based in San Martino di Lupari, Italy. It is the same club that operates the association football section of the same name.

History

The club was founded in 1996 formed after a merger of A.S.D. Luparense Calcio a 5 and A.S.D. Radio Birikina Luparense, the local futsal and football clubs. It is the most successful futsal club of Italy.

Sponsorship
The club was sponsored for several years by Alter Ego.

Ground
Its stadium is Palasport San Martino di Lupari with 800 seats.

Notable players 
Internationally capped players

  Humberto Honorio (2006-2015)
  Vampeta (2004-2012)

Honours
Serie A1:  2006–2007, 2007–2008, 2008–2009, 2011–2012, 2013-2014
Coppa Italia: 2006, 2008, 2013
Supercoppa Italiana: 2007, 2008, 2009, 2012, 2013
Coppa Italia Serie B: 2001

UEFA Club Competitions Record

UEFA Futsal Cup

External links
Official Website

Futsal clubs in Italy
Sport in Veneto
1996 establishments in Italy
Futsal clubs established in 1996